Park City is a census-designated place (CDP) in Lincoln County, Tennessee, United States. As of the 2010 census, its population was 2,442. Park City is the location of the Fayetteville Municipal Airport.

Geography
Park City is located south of Fayetteville, Tennessee and north of Hazel Green, Alabama along U.S. Route 231/U.S. Route 431 (unsigned State Route 10). State Route 275 also passes along the southern edge of Park City, connecting it with Flintville, Tennessee

Demographics

References

Census-designated places in Tennessee
Census-designated places in Lincoln County, Tennessee
Unincorporated communities in Tennessee
Unincorporated communities in Lincoln County, Tennessee